Hannah Louise Miley  (born 8 August 1989) is a Scottish former competitive swimmer who specialised in the Individual Medley. Miley trained when she was younger at Inverurie Swimming Centre. She has represented Great Britain at three Olympic Games, reaching the final of the 400 metres individual medley on each occasion, finishing sixth in 2008, fifth in 2012 and fourth in 2016. Also in the 400 m individual medley, she is a former World short-course champion (2012), European champion (2010), and two-time European short-course champion (2009 and 2012) representing Great Britain, and a two-time Commonwealth champion (2010 and 2014) representing Scotland.

Swimming career
She represented Scotland at the 2010 Commonwealth Games, winning a gold medal in the 400m individual medley.

Miley represented Great Britain at the 2008 Summer Olympics in the 200m and 400m individual medley swimming events and represented Great Britain at the 2012 Summer Olympics in the 400m individual medley, attaining 5th place.

In 2012, Miley became world and European 400 m individual medley short course champion. She became the first British swimmer to win three individual medals at a European Short Course Championships since Sue Rolph in 1999. Miley then won two medals at the World Short Course Championships, which included the first world title of her career.

In 2014, she retained her 400m individual medley title at the Commonwealth Games in Glasgow. At the Games, Miley reached seven finals and won two medals in total.

Miley made her Arena Pro Swim Series debut in February 2015, winning gold in the 200 m freestyle and 400 m individual medley, and six medals in total. She added a further two medals in March 2017, including gold in her strongest event.

Hannah Miley is currently supporting and is the face of the Kellogg's Free Kids Swim campaign.

She was born in Swindon, Wiltshire, England, and, a few months after being born, moved to Inverurie, Scotland where she attended Inverurie Academy before graduating from Robert Gordon University.

Miley was an ambassador for the LEN Short Course Championships in Glasgow in 2019.

Miley was appointed Member of the Order of the British Empire (MBE) in the 2022 Birthday Honours for services to swimming and women in sport.

Personal bests and records held

See also
List of World Aquatics Championships medalists in swimming (women)
List of Commonwealth Games medallists in swimming (women)

References

External links
British Swimming athlete profile
Scottish Swimming athlete profile
British Olympic Association athlete profile

1989 births
Scottish female swimmers
Female medley swimmers
Female butterfly swimmers
Olympic swimmers of Great Britain
Swimmers at the 2008 Summer Olympics
Swimmers at the 2012 Summer Olympics
Swimmers at the 2010 Commonwealth Games
Commonwealth Games gold medallists for Scotland
Sportspeople from Swindon
People from Inverurie
People educated at Inverurie Academy
Alumni of Robert Gordon University
Living people
Scottish female freestyle swimmers
World Aquatics Championships medalists in swimming
Medalists at the FINA World Swimming Championships (25 m)
European Aquatics Championships medalists in swimming
Commonwealth Games bronze medallists for Scotland
Swimmers at the 2016 Summer Olympics
Commonwealth Games medallists in swimming
Sportspeople from Aberdeenshire
Members of the Order of the British Empire
Medallists at the 2010 Commonwealth Games